Andrew Lapthorne and Peter Norfolk defeated the three-time defending champions Nicholas Taylor and David Wagner in the final, 6–3, 6–3 to win the quad doubles wheelchair tennis title at the 2011 Australian Open.

Main draw

Finals

References
 Main Draw

Wheelchair Quad Doubles
2011 Quad Doubles